The S3 is a service on the Nuremberg S-Bahn.

Future plans
There are plans for an infill station tentatively called "Neumarkt Süd" to better serve certain parts of Neumarkt in der Oberpfalz

Network

References

External links
 

Nuremberg S-Bahn lines
1992 establishments in Germany